St Mary's Church, Queniborough is the Church of England parish church of Queniborough, Leicestershire, England. The church mostly dates from the late 13th and early 14th centuries. It was grade I listed in 1966.  The church has a ring of 6 bells for bell ringing.

The churchyard contains war graves of a Royal Field Artillery soldier of World War I and an airman of World War II.

Parish status
The church is part of The Fosse Team which comprises the following churches
St Mary's Church, Barkby
St Hilda's Church, East Goscote
Holy Trinity Church, Thrussington
St Botolph's Church, Ratcliffe-on-the-Wreake
St Michael and All Angels’ Church, Rearsby
St Peter & St Paul, Syston
St Michael and All Angels’ Church, Thurmaston

References

Grade I listed churches in Leicestershire
Church of England church buildings in Leicestershire